

Events

By month

January events 
  18 January – Brand new V250-high speed EMU's taken out of Fyra-service definitely due to poor quality.
  28 January – New Orleans Regional Transit Authority Loyola Avenue Streetcar Line opened.

February events 
  10 February – opening of Milan Metro Line 5.
  11 February – Manchester Metrolink light rail system East Manchester Line opened to Droylsden.
  24 February – The platforms at Togoshi-kōen Station, on the Tokyu Oimachi Line in Shinagawa, Tokyo, Japan, are extended from three car lengths to five.

March events 
  16 March – Shibuya Station of Tokyu Toyoko Line move on underground station from ground station, with direct commuter express train start on Motomachi-Chūkagai of Yokohama to Hanno of Seibu Ikebukuro Line, Kawagoeshi of Tobu Tojo Line, via Tokyo Metro Fukutoshin Line. Tokyu Toyoko Line ends serving Tokyo Metro Hibiya Line trains.

April events 
  14 April – Utah Transit Authority's TRAX light rail Green Line extends service west from downtown Salt Lake City to the Salt Lake City International Airport.
  26 April – RTD's W-Line light rail corridor extends service west from Denver Union Station to Golden. This is the first FasTracks corridor to be completed.

May events 
  10 May – Norfolk Southern Railway announces the appointment of James A. Squires to become the railroad's new president effective 1 June.
  26 May – National Express' Essex Thameside franchise, c2c expires; extended through 2014.
  27 May – CapeFLYER summer weekend service from Boston, Massachusetts to Cape Cod begun.

July events 
 1 July – Opening of Hangzhou–Ningbo High-Speed Railway and Nanjing–Hangzhou Passenger Railway.
 6 July – Lac-Mégantic derailment: 47 people are killed in explosions and fire after an unattended train carrying Bakken formation crude oil runs away and derails in Lac-Mégantic, Quebec. It becomes the deadliest rail accident in Canadian history since 1864.
 24 July – Santiago de Compostela derailment: 79 people are killed when an Alvia train derails at excessive speed on a curve in Galicia (Spain).

August events
  18 August – Utah Transit Authority's TRAX light rail Blue Line extends service further south from Sandy to Draper.

September events 
  15 September – Xi'an Metro Line 1 opens in China.

October events
  15 October – The Kyushu Railway Company (Japan Railways Group) launches the 'Seven Stars in Kyushu' luxury sleeping car excursion train from Hakata Station with dedicated diesel locomotive haulage.
  29 October – Completion of Marmaray suburban rail project in Istanbul with official opening of its Marmaray Tunnel under the Bosphorus, the first standard gauge rail connection between Europe and Asia.

December events 
  8 December – Utah Transit Authority's S Line (formerly known as Sugar House Streetcar) opens with service from South Salt Lake to the Sugar House neighborhood of Salt Lake City.
 22 December – Downtown MRT Line Phase 1 scheduled to open.
 28 December – Opening of high speed Xiamen–Shenzhen Railway in southern China, fully completing the Hangzhou–Fuzhou–Shenzhen High-Speed Railway.
 28 December – Wuhan Metro Line 4 and Suzhou Metro Line 2, including Zhengzhou Metro has been opened.
 29 December – Shanghai Metro Lines 12 and 16 opened.

Deaths 
 28 May – Isabel Benham, American railroad financial expert, dies (b. 1909).
 23 August – Richard J. Corman, founder and owner of R.J. Corman Railroad Group, dies (b. 1955).

Industry awards

Japan 
 Awards presented by the Japan Railfan Club
 2013 Blue Ribbon Award: Tokyo Metro 1000 series EMU

References